Carl-Erik Mauritz "Jätten" Eriksson (born 20 May 1930) is a Swedish bobsledder who was the first person to compete in Bobsleigh at six Olympic Games (1964 to 1984).

Biography

Born in Stockholm, Eriksson was flag-bearer for Sweden at the 1976 Winter Olympics in Innsbruck. In the bobsled two-man sled, Eriksson came sixth (with Jan Johansson) at the 1972 Winter Olympics and ninth (with Kenth Rönn) at the 1976 Winter Olympics. 

The only other bobsledder to compete at six Olympics is Italian Gerda Weissensteiner, although only two of her six appearances were in bobsleigh (the other four were luge).

See also
 List of athletes with the most appearances at Olympic Games

References
Carl-Erik Eriksson's profile at Sports Reference.com

1930 births
Living people
Sportspeople from Stockholm
Swedish male bobsledders
Olympic bobsledders of Sweden
Bobsledders at the 1964 Winter Olympics
Bobsledders at the 1968 Winter Olympics
Bobsledders at the 1972 Winter Olympics
Bobsledders at the 1976 Winter Olympics
Bobsledders at the 1980 Winter Olympics
Bobsledders at the 1984 Winter Olympics
20th-century Swedish people